Benedikt may refer to:
	
Benedikt, a spelling of the name Benedict
Benedikt, Benedikt, a settlement in northeastern Slovenia